Reykjavík North is one of the six multi-member constituencies of the Althing, the national legislature of Iceland. The constituency was established in 2003 when the existing Reykjavík constituency was split into two. The constituency currently elects nine of the 63 members of the Althing using the open party-list proportional representation electoral system. At the 2021 parliamentary election it had 45,361 registered electors.

Electoral system
Reykjavík North currently elects nine of the 63 members of the Althing using the open party-list proportional representation electoral system. Constituency seats are allocated using the D'Hondt method. Compensatory seats (equalisation seas) are calculated based on the national vote and are allocated using the D'Hondt method at the constituency level. Only parties that reach the 5% national threshold compete for compensatory seats.

Election results

Summary

(Excludes compensatory seats.)

Detailed

2021
Results of the 2021 parliamentary election held on 25 September 2021:

The following candidates were elected:
Andrés Ingi Jónsson (P), 3,368.00 votes; Ásmundur Einar Daðason (B), 4,322.33 votes; Diljá Mist Einarsdóttir (D), 5,466.75 votes; Guðlaugur Þór Þórðarson (D), 7,269.50 votes; Halldóra Mogensen (P); 4,466.75 votes; Helga Vala Helgadóttir (S), 4,370.75 votes; Jóhann Páll Jóhanns­son (S). 3,323.00 votes; Katrín Jakobsdóttir (V), 5,592.75 votes; Steinunn Þóra Árnadóttir (V), 4,190.75 votes; Tómas A. Tómasson (F), 2,691.67 votes; and Þorbjörg Sigríður Gunnlaugsdóttir (C), 2,703.00 votes.

2017
Results of the 2017 parliamentary election held on 28 October 2017:

The following candidates were elected:
Andrés Ingi Jónsson (V), 5,144.83 votes; Áslaug Arna Sigurbjörnsdóttir (D), 6,612.67 vtes; Birgir Ármannsson (D), 5,418.00 votes; Guðlaugur Þór Þórðarson (D), 7,991.17 votes; Halldóra Mogensen (P); 3,637.50 votes; Helga Vala Helgadóttir (S), 4,542.67 votes; Helgi Hrafn Gunnarsson (P), 4,878.75 votes; Katrín Jakobsdóttir (V), 7,723.83 votes; Ólafur Ísleifsson (F), 2,539.33 votes; Steinunn Þóra Árnadóttir (V), 6,434.67 votes; and Þorsteinn Víglundsson (C), 2,994.33 votes.

2016
Results of the 2016 parliamentary election held on 29 October 2016:

The following candidates were elected:
Andrés Ingi Jónsson (V), 4,870.00 votes; Áslaug Arna Sigurbjörnsdóttir (D), 7,040.50 vtes; Birgir Ármannsson (D), 5,690.00 votes; Birgitta Jónsdóttir (P), 6,464.17 votes; Björn Leví Gunnarsson (P), 5,570.50 votes; Björt Ólafsdóttir (A), 2,655.33 votes; Guðlaugur Þór Þórðarson (D), 8,390.33 votes; Halldóra Mogensen (P); 4,452.50 votes; Katrín Jakobsdóttir (V), 7,315.33 votes; Steinunn Þóra Árnadóttir (V), 6,092.33 votes; and Þorsteinn Víglundsson (C), 4,011.67 votes.

2013
Results of the 2013 parliamentary election held on 27 April 2013:

The following candidates were elected:
Árni Þór Sigurðsson (V), 4,054.3 votes; Birgir Ármannsson (D), 5,439.0 votes; Björt Ólafsdóttir (A), 3,456.7 votes; Brynjar Níelsson (D), 6,719.5 votes; Frosti Sigurjónsson (B), 5,752.0 votes; Helgi Hrafn Gunnarsson (Þ), 2,383.0 votes; Illugi Gunnarsson (D), 7,943.0 votes; Katrín Jakobsdóttir (V), 5,488.0 votes; Össur Skarphéðinsson (S), 4,888.0 votes; Sigrún Magnúsdóttir (B), 4,234.5 votes; and Valgerður Bjarnadóttir (S), 3,693.8 votes.

2009
Results of the 2009 parliamentary election held on 25 April 2009:

The following candidates were elected:
Álfheiður Ingadóttir (V), 5,460.8 votes; Árni Þór Sigurðsson (V), 6,827.0 votes; Helgi Hjörvar (S), 9,535.0 votes; Illugi Gunnarsson (D), 7,285.5 votes; Jóhanna Sigurðardóttir (S), 11,526.5 votes; Katrín Jakobsdóttir (V), 8,380.8 votes; Pétur Blöndal (D), 5,501.0 votes; Sigmundur Davíð Gunnlaugsson (B), 3,360.0 votes; Steinunn Valdís Óskarsdóttir (S), 6,368.7 votes; Valgerður Bjarnadóttir (S), 8,645.5 votes; and Þráinn Bertelsson (O), 3,050.3 votes.

2007
Results of the 2007 parliamentary election held on 12 May 2007:

The following candidates were elected:
Árni Þór Sigurðsson (V), 4,405.5 votes; Ellert Schram (S), 6,162.6 votes; Guðfinna S. Bjarnadóttir (D), 11,121.7 votes; Guðlaugur Þór Þórðarson (D), 12,575.4 votes; Helgi Hjörvar (S), 8,150.6 votes; Jóhanna Sigurðardóttir (S), 9,205.6 votes; Katrín Jakobsdóttir (V), 5,911.5 votes; Össur Skarphéðinsson (S), 10,071.4 votes; Pétur Blöndal (D), 9,410.5 votes; Sigurður Kári Kristjánsson (D), 7,940.9 votes; and Steinunn Valdís Óskarsdóttir (S), 7,119.1 votes.

2003
Results of the 2003 parliamentary election held on 10 May 2003:

The following candidates were elected:
Árni Magnússon (B), 3,149.2 votes; Björn Bjarnason (D), 11,097.2 votes; Bryndís Hlöðversdóttir (S), 11,454.6 votes; Davíð Oddsson (D), 12,704.7 votes; Guðlaugur Þór Þórðarson (D), 9,519.5 votes; Guðrún Ögmundsdóttir (S), 9,820.2 votes; Halldór Ásgrímsson (B), 4,181.5 votes; Helgi Hjörvar (S), 7,998.5 votes; Kolbrún Halldórsdóttir (U), 3,328.0 votes; Össur Skarphéðinsson (S), 12,653.2 votes; and Sigurður Kári Kristjánsson (D), 7,982.1 votes.

References

2003 establishments in Iceland
Althing constituencies
Constituencies established in 2003
Althing constituency, North